The 2022 Massachusetts State Collegiate Athletic Conference football season was the 10th season of the Massachusetts State Collegiate Athletic Conference football taking place during the 2022 NCAA Division III football season. The season began on September 2 with non-conference play. Conference play began on September 16, 2022.
  
The MASCAC Championship Game was played at Panther Field in Plymouth, New Hampshire, on November 12, 2022. The game featured the UMass Dartmouth Corsairs and the Plymouth State Panthers.

Background

Previous season 

The 2021 Massachusetts State Collegiate Athletic Conference champion was Framingham State with a record of 8–3 overall, and 8–0 in conference play.

Preseason

Recruiting classes

Preseason poll 
The preseason poll was released on August 30, 2022.

 First place votes in 

Head coaches

Schedule 

All times EST time.

† denotes Homecoming game

Regular season schedule

Week One

Week Two

Week Three

Week Four

Week Five

Week Six

Week Seven

Week Eight

Week Nine

Week Ten

Week Eleven

Postseason

Bowl games 

Rankings are from CFP rankings.  All times Eastern Standard Time. MASCAC teams shown in bold.

Head to head matchups 

Updated with the results of all regular season conference games.

Awards and honors

Player of the week honors

MASCAC Individual Awards 
The following individuals received postseason honors as voted by the Massachusetts State Collegiate Athletic Conference football coaches at the end of the season.

All-conference teams 
The following players earned All-MASCAC honors.

First Team

Second Team

All-Academic 

 Bridgewater State: Brendan Albert, Colin Anzeveno, Ryan Burchard, Dustin Burkle, James Cahoon, Brian Campagna, Chonlee Cine, Ryan Coonan, Gavin Cooney, Adam Couch, Brandon Daley, Connor Daley, Andre Domond, Adam Ferrara, James Fontaine, Zachary Gamelin, Mattheau Guadet, Sean Howe, Benjamin Landry, Josh Ligor, Robert Marshall, Jack McCarthy, Benjamin McMahon, Brandon Medeiros, Joey Naso, Marvell Nicholson, Michael Nocera, Ewan Oliveira, Nathan Oliver, William Pointer, SP Pragano, Patrick Quinn, Zachary Souza, Aiden Tremblay, Jonah Varallo, Anton Vasquez, Mitchell Weston
 Fitchburg State: Amzie Hinkley, Calvin Guillaume, Cameron Monette, Christopher Emslie, Dylan Cosner, Elijah McKnight, Frank Opoku, Giancarlo Marazzo-Henry, Jakob Lufkin, John McGarry, Keyshawn McCurdy, Logan Perez, Nicholas Notenboom
 Framingham State: Thiago Andrade, Teaghin Andre, Nick Ashley, John Burke, Brian Callery, Mick Coronel, Cully Curran, Marquis DosSantos, Paul Goggin, Nick Gordon, Augustus Granata, Tishay Johnson Jr., Bryan Lawton, Nick Marcinowski, Cole Moretti, Nolan Mulachy, Barry Nangle, Alexander Ruppert, Terry Smith, Zach Walker
 Massachusetts Maritime: Jack Mulligan, Liam Hines, William Eltringham, Mark Imparato, Nicolas Ford, Owen Roth, Devon Krajewski, Edward Barlage, Mac Kromenhoek, James Cassidy, Leo Allgaier, Ian Curvelo, Luke Maffeo, Hunter Lassere, William Gorry, Andrew Longwater, William Horlbogen, Hugh Wells, Liam Clayton, Daniel Short, Zach Sanoussi, Mack Brown, Samuel Cassidy, Zachary Maffeo, Jacob Nutter, Nick Gramoli, Conor McCormick, Travis VanDinter, Andrew Brightman, Luke Dawson, Evan Vieira, Jonah Mitchell, Jershawn Freeman, Jacob Umberhind, Marc Murphy, Cole Keefe, Cobey Williamson, Nikos Biskaduros, Mason Erickson, Joseph Grelli
 Plymouth State: Chauncey Alado, Kayden Baillargeon, Kyle Baker, Cooper Bartlett, Sam Bolinsky, Thanos Boulukos, Nikos Bouzakis, Colton Burrows, Frank Capaldo, Sam Cerqueira, Kyle Chamberlin, Mitchell Cripps, Collin Crowe, Jake Currier, Ryan Fleming, Sam Fleming, Alex Flynn, Jack Glanville, Tyler Gleifert, Matthew Griffing, Shawn Harrington, Jyaire Hatcher, Zach Herman, Zach Hodge, Ruchan Karagoz, AJ Laccona, Dylan Leonard, Mikey Levesque, Braden Lynn, Jack Marsden, Shea McClellan, Troy Muldoon, Luc Normandeau, Keegan O'Connor, Christian Paillet, Charlie Palmer, Michael Pesiridis, Tanner Plourde, Jon Proia, Sean Quinn, Nicholas Rendon, Jake Richards, Patrick Rush, Kevin Salvatore, Manny Sanchezm, Nick Savariego, Derrick Shepherd, Gannon Stewart, Dylan Szostak, Mike Terrazzano, Emmanuel Ughu, Cooper Varano, Sam Weidemier, Cameron Wesse, Evan Wilson
 UMass Dartmouth: Dylan Bradley, Colby Briggs, Jonathan Brightman, Easten Coleman, Brandon DiChiaro, Connor Donohue, Collin Farr, Jacob Furtado, Che'Saih Hill-Gore, Matt Kirrane, Jaydon Lame, Jeffy Le, J.P. Mason, Jason Motta, Andrew Paulus, Owen Quigley, Alex Santini, Jason Scott, Jake Sioch, Michael Vincent, Liam Whaley
 Western Connecticut: Patrick Adams, Jordan Agosto, Daniel Barry, David Boatswain, Daniel Chalghin, Andrew Colletti, Riley De Meo, Charles Demartino, Devin Demetres, Michael Dicostanzo, George Doherty, Matthew Forti, Nicholas Gambino, Michael Gargano, Amir Gharbi, Aidan Hanley-Piri, John-Paul Hernandez, Stephen Johnson, Gavin Jones-Phillips, Kieran Kelly, Elias Koukoulis, Brian Lombardo, Stephen Macri, Michael Matich, Donovan Miller, Dalton Modehn, Caleb Nimo-Sefah, Travis O'Neill, Kenneth Okoroafor, Marcus Osieczkowski, Luke Pappalardo, Mason Phuong, Troy Pomykala, Alexis Reyes, Dominic Rienzi, Brandon Rigdon, Zach Soriano, Joshua Sote, Jacob St. Louis, Owen Stark, Kirk Stevenson, Corey Tehe, Nicholas Troy, Nosakhare Uzamere, Ryan Van Dyke, Alex Vita, Elijah Washington, Anthony Weidtman, Dylan Wilson, Jaedon Wolfe, Kevin Wood
 Westfield State: Julian Bass, Dominic Carme, Frederick Centrella, Cameron Danahy, Brendan DeBarber, Kyle Dodge, Michael Foley, Tobias Gaulden Wheeler, Nikolaos Giotsas, Christopher Greene, Anthony Messore, Timothy O'Connor, Joel Perez Guzman, Colby Pires, Ethan Russell, Blake Simpson, Jordan Smith, Peter Spinale, Zachary Thetreault, Malachi Wright
 Worcester State: Dominic Annese, Cameron Ayotte, Layne Benton, Samuel Brewer, Mason Broyles, Kevin Byrnes, Daniel Diverdi, Samuel Duah, Wafic Ellakis, Dylan Hall, Micah Haynes, Brodie Jacques, Trever Johnson, Ryan Justin, Jake Lajoie, Gavin LePage, Tyler Leino, Michael Loveless, Michael Mahoney, Curt Marshall, Jamison Metcalf, Austin Michaelson, Matthew O'Connor, Noah Peterson, Calvin Polchlopek, Santiago Rodriguez-D'atr, Melke Shabo, Justin Sneed, Logan Sylvester, Alexander Thibeault, Caleb Thompson, Drew Von Klock, Kyle Wall, Nathan Winco

Notes

References